Michael Wadding may refer to:
 Michael Wadding (television), British television writer, director and producer
 Michael Wadding (priest) (1591–1644), Irish Roman Catholic priest and missionary
 Michael Wadding (referee), Irish hurling referee